Dushman is a 2022 Pakistani drama television series first broadcast on PTV Home as a part of night primetime programming. It is written by Ali Moeen, directed by Abdullah Badini, and produced by Zeeshan Ahmed under banner Mont Blanc Entertainment. The series has an ensemble cast of Nadia Afgan, Saman Ansari, Feroza Muhammad, Nayyar Ejaz, Hassan Niazi, Sabeeka Imam, Ayub Khoso and Naila Jaffri in her last on-screen appearance.

Plot 

There is a generation of adversey between the states of Rajkot and Malikgar. In this bloodshed game, all the male heirs have been murdered and then the feuding matriarchs fight for revenge. Waris and Sassi, the children of these matriarchs fall for each other and marry secretly. However, when Mai Lali of Rajkot comes to know about this, he murders Waris. Waris's pregnant wife and Mai's daughter, Sassi seeks shelter with the Maliks as she wants to hand over her unborn to Waris' family. Enraged by her brother's murder, Sohni returns from abroad and sets a trap for the last heir of the enemies, Mai Laali's son Zain.

Cast 

 Nadia Afgan as Malkani Bibi
 Saman Ansari as Mai Laali
 Naila Jaffri as Durri
 Sabeeka Imam as Sassi
 Hassan Niazi as Waris
 Nayyar Ejaz as Ranjha
 Ayub Khoso as Billa "Munshi"
 Mohsin Gillani as Malhar
 Hadi Bin Arshad as Zain
 Feroza Mohammad as Sohni

Production
The project was first announced by Afgan in an interview where she revealed that one of her upcoming series is titled Dushman which is directed by Abdullah Badini and written by Ali Moeen, and she will play the role of a powerful Saraiki head of the clan. The principal photography started in Bahawalpur in 2020. In a conservation with DAWN Images, Afgan told that the series is developed by Fawad Chaudhry, who worked hard for the PTV's revival. An accidental on the set led to the death of the series cinematographeemr Sarfaraz Ahmed. It marked actres Naila Jaffri's last appearance before her death due to Ovarian cancer in July 2021. According to Muhammad, the series took 3 years to complete.

Reception 
The acting performances of the actors was especially praised by the critics. Youline Magazine praised the Moeen's writing and performances of the actors, except of Ansari. The reviewer criticised her nasal voice and her badly delivered dialogues.

References

Television series set in Bahawalpur
2022 Pakistani television series debuts